
Gmina Lipnica is a rural gmina (administrative district) in Bytów County, Pomeranian Voivodeship, in northern Poland.

Mayor of the municipality is Andrzej Lemańczyk.

Neighbouring gminas
Gmina Lipnica is bordered by the gminas of Brusy, Bytów, Chojnice, Koczała, Konarzyny, Miastko, Przechlewo, Studzienice and Tuchomie.

References
Polish official population figures 2006

Lipnica
Bytów County